Marko Vogrič (born 26 June 1976) is a retired Slovenian football striker.

References

1976 births
Living people
Slovenian footballers
ND Gorica players
NK Rudar Velenje players
NK Primorje players
Ionikos F.C. players
Association football forwards
Slovenian expatriate footballers
Expatriate footballers in Greece
Slovenian expatriate sportspeople in Greece
Super League Greece players